List of K-pop songs on the World Digital Song Sales chart is a compilation of weekly chart information for K-pop music published on the World Digital Song Sales chart by the Billboard charts, and reported on by Billboard K-Town, an online Billboard column. This is a list of K-pop songs and singles, and songs performed by K-pop artists, on the Billboard chart. More song chart information can be found at the List of K-pop songs on the Billboard charts.

2010–present
This list depends on continual updates taken from * and *.
 The chart has been updated from 2010–present and is marked (Complete).
Billboard artists comprehensive update incomplete.
Figures in red highlight indicate the highest ranking achieved by K-pop artists on the chart.
 – Current week's charting

World Digital Song Sales (Complete)
 Chart started 2010-01-23 and lists top 25 only

See also
 List of K-pop on the Billboard charts
 List of K-pop albums on the Billboard charts
 List of K-pop on the Billboard year-end charts
 Timeline of K-pop at Billboard
 Timeline of K-pop at Billboard in the 2020s
 Korea K-Pop Hot 100
 List of K-Pop concerts held outside Asia
 List of K-pop artists
 List of South Korean idol groups
 World Digital Song Sales

Notes

References

External links
Billboard popular charts
Billboard complete artist/chart search -subscription only

Billboard charts
K-pop songs
K-pop songs
South Korean music-related lists
2009 in South Korean music
2010 in South Korean music
2011 in South Korean music
2012 in South Korean music
2013 in South Korean music
2014 in South Korean music
2015 in South Korean music
2016 in South Korean music
2017 in South Korean music
2018 in South Korean music
2019 in South Korean music
2020 in South Korean music
2000s in South Korean music
2010s in South Korean music
2020s in South Korean music